Wolfgramm may refer to:

Bill Wolfgramm (Tongan musician) 
Greg Wolfgramm (born 1974), Tongan rugby league player
Nani Wolfgramm (Tongan musician) 
Paea Wolfgramm (Tongan boxer)
Willie Wolfgramm (Tongan rugby league player)
The Jets, Minneapolis-based Tongan singing group made up of members of the Wolfgramm family

See also
 Wolfgram